Iraqi Biradri is a Sunni Muslim caste found chiefly in Ghazipur, Azamgarh, Ballia, Deoria and Gorakhpur districts of the eastern Uttar Pradesh  in India. Iraqi Biradri is also referred to as Iraqi Shaikh.

History and origin
Iraqi biradri is a descendant population of immigrants from the country of Iraq. Recent facts argue that their ancestors were the immediate descendants of Sayyid Masud Al Hussaini and his poorly defined retinue, all recent immigrants from Iraq. Sayyid Masud Al Hussaini successfully extended the Ghazipur area under Delhi Sultanate, settling with his family in the newly conquered city during the Mamluk Sultan Firoz Shah Tughlaq circa 1330.

As a result, Iraqi Biradri are known have to settled in Ghazipur in the 14th century, with an origin roughly 700 years ago. Initially, for a couple of centuries, the population growth took place chiefly in Nonahra, among other places, in Ghazipur, and subsequently, a population dispersal began in neighboring districts, namely, Azamgarh, Ballia, Deoria, Gorakhpur, and some other places in eastern Uttar Pradesh. Their ancestors as old as 300 years or more are very well-identified in many towns/villages of the aforementioned districts including Ghazipur in the form of distinct families trees.

With reference to the Sunni Muslim ‘Iraqi Biradri’, more than a century earlier, in relation to another Muslim caste from the converted Hindu Kalals (a class of wholly Muslim caste after the conversion) or simply ‘Kalal Iraqis’ in the United Provinces (or U.P.), a fallacy was created from the work of the British colonial civil administrators and others as published elsewhere. 

Those authors did not attempt to distinguish the two populations. In fact, they grouped Iraqi Biradri together with the Kalal Iraqis who actually dealt with the business of ‘Araq’ or spirituous liquor in the past as ‘Araquis’ in U.P. (also in Bihar), assuming that the claim of Iraqi Biradri to be immigrants of the country Iraq was fictitious. It is not a correct way to characterize them in one group without taking into account all the properties pointed out in some of the papers, such as political/cultural practices, place, and origin, with respect to each population (also the phylogenetic Y-DNA trees).

It is described clearly in the above papers that the "Kalal Iraqis" reside mainly In the Mirzapur district, are linked with indigenous roots in India i.e. Hindu rituals are noted in marriage/divorce activities; they practice hypergamy and they are under the caste Panchayat rule. By contrast, the descendant families under "Iraqi Biradri" are identified distinctly as follows: the bulk of them reside mainly at places i.e. Ghazipur, Ballia, Deoria and Gorakhpur (not Mirzapur) in the Eastern U.P.; time of their domicile in India is relatively recent -Hindu rituals/traditions do not exist in marriages or divorces; they are not under caste Panchayat rule; their combined patrilineal Y-DNA phylogenetic trees are possibly unique, see below. The failure to distinguish "Iraqi Biradri" from others earlier in the above publications may be due to a deliberate attempt or a fortuitous omission by the authors, but it alters the characteristics of the Sunni "Iraqi Biradri" as a caste with foreign roots to that of a caste with no foreign roots - a low status.

Present circumstances
Consistent with a past record of enterprising Iraqi Biradri in U.P, majority of the them were engaged in manufacturing business/trades of goods during the 20th century, albeit a small number acted as money lenders, Zamindars with and without cultivating lands in villages in some districts like Ballia.  Examples in the recent past included: ownerships of Sugar Mills in North Eastern U.P., North Western Bihar, Textile mills in Kolkata and leather tanneries in Kanpur, and Hotel business in Nepal. The Iraqi Biradri who live in big towns in India continues to do businesses that include Leather Industry in Kanpur, Kolkata, and Chennai, Hotel and tourism Business in Nepal.  Otherwise, the majority has been involved in retail business/small manufacturing business in places of residence. The educated members of the Biradri, few in number, work as medical doctors, teachers, and engineers in India and abroad.

Census and language
The present population size of Iraqi Biradri may fall in the category of small ethnic groups in India. The basal population still lives in towns of its origin and other nearby towns in Ghazipur, Ballia, Deoria/Gorakhpur, Mau, and Azamgarh in Eastern U.P. against the continuous flow of population out of those towns during the last 600-700 years.  The people speak Urdu and local Bhojpuri, and Awadhi dialects. The grasp on Arabic/Persian used to be strong in most families 50-100 years ago.

Genetic background
Iraqi Biradri practices endogamy within its own population; consanguineous i.e. first cousin/second-cousin marriages are allowed. A genetic study on Y-chromosome SNP and Y-DNA STR in a large sample of extant Biradri need to be done. However, a few Y-DNA SNP phylogenetic tree results from the male members of the Biradri are known between them. The members are second to 3rd cousins based on autosomal DNA overlapping noted in the DNA relative section of the result by 23andMe. After confirming each other as members of the Biradri, our Y-DNA SNP haplogroup include:

M198(R1a1a)-->Z93/Z94→Y40→M560; 

M198(R1a1a)-->Z93/Z94→L657→Y6;  

J2→J2a1→L26→L24→L25; J2-M172→J2b M102→J2b2-J-M241; and 

J1-M267→J1a CTS5368/Z2215.

Notable people
 
 
Lari Azad, Indian historian and Writer
Nasreen Jalil, Pakistani senator and daughter of Zafarul Ahsan Indian Civil Service officer of the 1936 batch and former Chairman of Pakistan International Airlines
Ghazala Lari, Indian politician, and former member of the Uttar Pradesh Legislative Assembly (2008-2017)
Maqbool Ahmed Lari, Indian philanthropist, recipient of the Padma Shri in 1971
Yasmeen Lari, first female architect in Pakistan and daughter-in-law of Justice Z. H. Lari deputy Leader of the opposition in Uttar Pradesh Legislative Assembly (1936-1947) and member of the Constituent Assembly of India

People from the community carry the surname Lari from Lar, Uttar Pradesh in Deoria district, a historic center of the community.

References

Islamic honorifics
Indian Sunni Muslims
Muslim communities of Uttar Pradesh
Muslim communities of India
People from Deoria district
People from Mau district
People from Gorakhpur
People from Azamgarh
People from Ghazipur
People from Ballia district